CPR Aberdeen Yard is one of two CPR facilities in Hamilton, Ontario, Canada. 

The yard is located in Kirkendall North, next to Chedoke Park and short distance from McMaster Children's Hospital Hamilton Health Sciences. The yard was formerly used by Toronto, Hamilton and Buffalo Railway and once had a roundhouse.

See also

The other CPR facility in the city is the CPR Kinnear Yard.

Incidents

 August 13 2008 - 3 car derailment at yard

References

Canadian Pacific Railway facilities
Rail infrastructure in Hamilton, Ontario